The premier of Western Australia is the head of government of the state of Western Australia. The role of premier at a state level is similar to the role of the prime minister of Australia at a federal level. The premier leads the executive branch of the Government of Western Australia and is accountable to the Parliament of Western Australia. The premier is appointed by the governor of Western Australia. By convention, the governor appoints as premier whoever has the support of the majority of the Western Australian Legislative Assembly. In practice, this means that the premier is the leader of the political party or group of parties with a majority of seats in the Legislative Assembly (lower house). Since Western Australia achieved self-governance in 1890, there have been 31 premiers. Mark McGowan is the current premier, having been appointed to the position on 17 March 2017.

History
The position of premier is not mentioned in the constitution of Western Australia. From 1890 to 1917, the premier was not an official position, rather, it was the title unofficially given, but widely used to refer, to the head of the government. When Western Australia became a self-governing colony in 1890, Governor William Robinson initially indicated he would use the title prime minister to refer to the head of the government. However, after he selected John Forrest, the title premier was used for consistency with the other Australian colonies. The position was first officially mentioned when the governor appointed Henry Lefroy as premier on 28 June 1917. However, when the governor designated and declared the six executive offices of the government on 2 July 1917, the position of premier was not listed, creating an ambiguity. It was not until 3 April 1947 that the premier became one of the executive offices of the government.

The most common cause for a change of premier is an election. Since the 1990s, elections have occurred roughly every four years. Before then, elections were at most three years apart, except for during World War II. A less common cause for a change of premier is the ruling party changing its leader. This can occur as a result of a resignation, death or leadership spill. In this case, the new premier is whoever the party elects as its new leader. Another cause for a change of premier is a loss of majority support in the Legislative Assembly. This commonly occurred in the first three decades of self-governance, but has not occurred since 1916. If this occurs, the premier must either resign or be dismissed by the governor.

Powers and function
The powers of the premier are set out by convention and by legislation. By convention, the premier advises the Monarch of Australia as to who to appoint as governor. The premier advises the governor as to who to appoint to cabinet and which portfolios should be given to each cabinet minister, and the governor follows this advice by convention. The premier sets out the responsibilities of ministers and the acts that they would administer. The premier leads the cabinet and chairs cabinet meetings. They communicate with the governor, the cabinet, the state government, other state and territory governments, the federal government, and overseas governments. The premier advises the governor on when state elections should be held. They oversee the Department of the Premier and Cabinet. Whilst premier, they stay as a member of parliament, and they retain their responsibility for representing their electorate.

Characteristics
As of 2022, there have been 31 premiers of Western Australia. Carmen Lawrence, who was appointed on 12 February 1990, is the first and only woman to be premier of Western Australia. She is also the first woman to be premier of an Australian state. By convention, the premier is a member of the Legislative Assembly. However, the premier can be a member of either house of parliament. Hal Colebatch is the only premier to be a member of the Legislative Council (upper house). He served for 30 days in 1919, making him the shortest serving premier of Western Australia. David Brand is the longest serving premier, serving for 11 years and 335 days between 1959 and 1971. The youngest premier is John Scaddan, who was 35 years, 2 months and 3 days old when he was sworn in in 1911. The oldest premier is John Tonkin, who was 69 years, 1 month and 1 day old when he was sworn in in 1971. Newton Moore became premier after two years in parliament, the least time aside from John Forrest. John Tonkin became premier after almost 38 years in parliament, the most time in parliament before becoming premier. The only father and son pair to have both been premier is Charles Court and his son Richard Court. George Leake, who died of pneumonia on 24 June 1902, is the only premier to have died in office. Newton Moore, Philip Collier, John Willcock and Geoff Gallop are the only premiers to have resigned due to ill health. The only premier to subsequently serve as governor is James Mitchell.

Two former premiers have been sentenced to jail. In 1994, Brian Burke was sentenced to two years in jail for defrauding the state by $17,000 by making false claims on the parliamentary imprest account. He was released on parole after serving seven months. In 1995, Ray O'Connor was sentenced to six months in jail for stealing a $25,000 cheque from the Bond Corporation during his time as premier. In 1997, Burke was sentenced to three years jail for stealing $122,585 in Labor Party campaign donations. He served six months before this conviction was quashed upon appeal.

List of premiers of Western Australia

Graphical timeline

References

Bibliography 
 
 

Western Australia

Premiers